Canadian chess periodicals encompasses the names, publication dates and history of the many chess magazines published in Canada.

Chess Federation of Canada

Chess Canada formerly called, En Passant and CFC Bulletin was a hard copy bi-monthly chess journal published by the Chess Federation of Canada (CFC) from 1974 to 2008. The magazine's focus was on the Canadian chess scene, including but not limited to: tournaments, CFC members ELO's, articles and game analysis. The magazine was discontinued with CFC members now receiving a monthly email with the Canadian Chess News magazine in Portable Document Format (PDF) format.  Members can either read the magazine on their computer monitor or print a hard copy version.

List of Canadian chess periodicals
This list reflects the many periodicals that have appeared in the Canadian chess scene over the years:
 Alberta Chess Report (2006-2009)
 Apprenti sorcier (1991-1993)
 B.C. Chess (1969-1970)
 B.C. Chess Magazine later The Canadian Chess Magazine (1918-1919)
 B.C. Chess Reports later Counterplay (1981-1984)
 Bluenose Chess Bulletin (1968)
 British Columbia Chess Report (1976-1979)
 British Columbia Correspondence Chess Club Bulletin later several names (1956-1968)
 Bulletin de la Ligue d'Échecs de la Mauricie (1975-1980)
 Bulletin d'information, Ligue d'échecs de Montreal (1977-1983)
 Bulletin du Club, International Chess Club of Canada (1983)
 Cahier previously and later Chess Central Bugle (1976)
 Canadian Checkerist (1888 - ?)
 Canadian Chess Chat originally Maritime Chess News (1947)
 Maritime Chess Chat (1950-1992)
 The Canadian Chess Magazine originally B.C. Chess Magazine (1991-1920)
 Canadian Chessner (1934-1937)
 Canadian Chess News (2009-2010)
 Canadian Chess Newsletter (2009)
 Canadian Chess Review (1991)
 Canadian Chess Scene (1972)
 CHECK! (1927-1968)
 Checkmate (1901-1904)
 Chess - Canadian Supplement (1937-1943)
 Chess Canada (1970-1975)
 Chess Canada Échecs (1973-2008)
 Chess Central Bugle (1974-1976)
 Chess Institute of Canada Newsletter (2006)
 The Chess Tablet (1957)
 Chess then and now (1999-2001)
 Cine Chess (1972)
 City Chess Club Newsletter (19??)
 Club talk (1993)
 Contented Knights (1949-1950)
 Échec+ previously Le Petit Roque (1984)
 Échec au roi (1988-2009)
 Échecs Montréal (1976)
 Échecs premiere classe French edition of CHECK! (1975-1989) 
 En Passant (1979)
 Exclam! (1988-1999)
 Governors' Letter (2010)
 Hébert Parle Échecs (1974-2009)
 The Kibitizer (1977-1978)
 Le Légéchecs (1979-1980)
 Manitoba Tournament Bulletin (1991)
 Matou previously Le Légéchecs (1980-1995)
 Metro Toronto Secondary School Chess Association Newsletter (1969-1974)
 Newsletter, Ontario Chess Association (1996)
 Northern, Chess Federation of Canada (1983-1994)
 Ontario Chess News (1981-1982)
 The Open File (1991)
 Le Petit Roque previously Québéchecs (1980-1984)
 Le Pion (1924-1926)
 Québéchecs later Le Petit Roque (1978-1980)
 Québéchecs (1973)
 Rank and File previously Chess Central Bugle (1977-1983)
 Chess Federation of Canada (1971-1973)
 Saskatchewan Chess (1962-1964)
 Scarboro Community of Toronto Chess News and Views (1999-2012)
 Scholar's Mate (1989-2009)
 Spéchecs: Bulletin du club Le Specialiste des échecs (1979-1982)
 The Things People Do (2005)
 Toronto Chess Club Journal (19??)
 Toronto Chess News (2012)

See also

 Chess columns in newspapers
 Chess library
 List of chess periodicals
 List of chess books

References

Further reading
 Di Felice, Gino. (2010). Chess Periodicals: An Annotated International Bibliography, 1836-2008. Mcfarland & Co Inc Pub. 

Magazines published in Canada
Chess in Canada
Chess periodicals
Chess-related lists